Rhine Center (also known as Rhine) is an unincorporated community located in the town of Rhine, Sheboygan County, Wisconsin, United States.

References

Unincorporated communities in Sheboygan County, Wisconsin
Unincorporated communities in Wisconsin